Sertulariidae is a family of hydrozoans.

Genera 
According to the World Register of Marine Species, the following genera belong to this family:
 Calamphora Allman, 1888
 Sertularella Gray, 1848

References 

  
Sertularioidea
Cnidarian families